Li Yim Lam (born 1 October 1993) is a Hong Kong footballer who played for Hong Kong First Division League club South China as a centre forward.

Club career

South China
In July 2011, Li Yim Lam was promoted from the reserve to the first team. He will wear number 19 in the season 2011/2012.

In August 2011, he was being loaned to a new form club Hong Kong Sapling.

Hong Kong Sapling
Unlike the other two South China loanee, Cheung Chun Hei and Kot Cho Wai, Li Yim Lam only got a few chances in his loan spell in Hong Kong Sapling. He made his debut for Hong Kong Sapling against Sunray Cave JC Sun Hei as a 66th-minute substitute for Li Ngai Hoi. This is his only league appearance in the season. He also featured one league cup match against Sham Shui Po as a half-time substitute for Tsang Kin Fong.

Telecom

On Good

Career statistics
 As of 28 September 2012

References

External links
Li Yim Lam at HKFA

1992 births
Living people
Association football defenders
Hong Kong footballers
Hong Kong First Division League players
South China AA players